"Sail Away" is a song by Randy Newman, the title track of his 1972 album. In a 1972 review in Rolling Stone, Stephen Holden describes "Sail Away" as presenting "the American dream of a promised land as it might have been presented to black Africa in slave running days."

Music
The song is written in the key of F major, and performed in that key on the album.  The original album recording features an ostinato piano part, played by Newman (who also sings the lyrics), accompanied by a full orchestra (strings, winds and brass) for harmonic and melodic fills.  It features a set of relatively simple (for Newman) chord changes in the blues-country-rock-gospel progression that Newman is so well known for.

Significance

"Sail Away" has been widely praised by critics and Newman fans as one of his finest works.  It is often cited among the best tracks on one of his best albums.  Like many Newman songs, the relative simplicity and "hominess" of the music contrast powerfully with the emotional fortitude of the lyrics. Greil Marcus wrote in his 1975 book Mystery Train: Images of America in Rock 'n' Roll Music that the song is "like a vision of heaven superimposed on hell."

"Sail Away" has been covered by many artists in live performances, notably, Ray Charles, Sonny Terry and Brownie McGhee, Etta James,  Frankie Miller, Roseanna Vitro, Bobby Doyle, Linda Ronstadt, Ann Wilson, Dave Van Ronk, Harry Nilsson, and Dave Matthews. On her first solo album, Gladys Knight covered it as part of a medley with Allen Toussaint's song "Freedom for the Stallion", which shares themes of the slave trade.

Bobby Darin covered the song on his last album before he died in 1973, Motown's Bobby Darin. Newman later said, "Bobby Darin could sing, but he did 'Sail Away,' and, well... I don't think he understood it. He did it like was a happy song about coming to America."

In 2011 it was listed at number 268 on Rolling Stone's 500 Greatest Songs of All Time.

References

1972 songs
Randy Newman songs
Songs written by Randy Newman
Song recordings produced by Russ Titelman
Song recordings produced by Lenny Waronker
Songs about the United States
Reprise Records singles
Bobby Darin songs
Works about American slavery